New Low is a 2010 independent American romantic comedy film written, directed, produced, and edited by Adam Bowers, who also stars in the film along with Jayme Ratzer, Valerie Jones, and YouTube personality Toby Turner. It premiered January 23, 2010 at the Sundance Film Festival.

Plot 
Wendell, a neurotic, aimless twentysomething, struggles to figure out which girl he really belongs with: Joanna, the best girl he's ever known, or Vicky, the worst. His friend Dave helps him sort through his thoughts as Wendell discovers not only whom he should be with but who he truly is under all that neurosis.

Reception
New Low has received mostly positive reception. Variety called the film "hilarious" and said it "smells like a cult hit."

The Orlando Sentinel rated it 3.5 out of 4 stars.

Independent Film Quarterly said, "Easily containing some of the best film writing and dialogue over the past few years, New Low looks and feels like a Woody Allen -penned script filtered through a Slacker-era Richard Linklater visual sensibility."

The A.V. Club commented, "Sharp, witty, frequently laugh-out-loud funny."

Release 
On January 17, 2011, the film was released digitally through a partnership between the Sundance Institute and New Video. It is also being self-distributed internationally on DVD through the movie's website.

References

External links 
 
 

2010 films
Films shot in Florida
American independent films
2010 romantic comedy-drama films
American romantic comedy-drama films
2010 independent films
2010s English-language films
2010s American films